Yupiltepeque is an extinct Xincan language of Guatemala, from the region of Yupiltepeque.

References

Sources
 Campbell, Lyle (1997). American Indian languages: The historical linguistics of Native America. New York: Oxford University Press. .

Xincan languages
Languages extinct in the 1920s
Languages of Guatemala
Extinct languages of North America